Eugène de Malbos (21 August 1811 – 29 May 1858) was a French Romantic painter known for his lithographs of the Pyrenees.

Some of his works are hosted by the Paul-Dupuy Museum in Toulouse. His signature is : “E. de Mal.”.

Selected works and publications 
 Un voyage d'artiste. Guide dans les Pyrénées par deux amis, Dagalier, Toulouse 1835, with Gustave de Clausade
 Croquis d'un élève de M. Latour, published by Constantin in Toulouse, 22 lithographs 48 x 33 drawn between 1825 and 1830
 Une visite au bon roy Henry, suivie d'une excursion au Guispuscoa, par Bayonne, text of Gustave de Clausade, published by Constantin in Toulouse, 1843, 15 lithographs
 Les plus beaux sites des Pyrénées, published by Dufour in Tarbes, and Frick imprimeur in Paris. 13 works + 16 works from Maxime Lalanne
 Les Pyrénées romantiques by Frédéric Soutras : with 9 lithographs
 Le Routier des Frontières Méridionales contain some lithographs
 Guide-album aux eaux des Pyrénées : Vallées du Lavedan. Argelès, Castelloubon, Saint Savin, Azun, Gazost, Cauterets by Joseph-Bernard Abadie contain 16 colors lithographs

Further reading
 Marguerite Gaston, Images romantiques des Pyrénées. Les amis du musée pyrénéen. 1975.
 Christian de Seauve, Caraman 1581-1858. Chronique d’une maison l’hôtel de Malbos, son environnement catholique et protestant. Les collectionneurs amateurs 31460 Caraman. 1998 
 Antoine de Seauve (under the direction of Dominique Buis, Marie-Jo Volle, Nathalie Garel), Eugène de Malbos, in Peindre l'Ardèche, Peindre en Ardèche - de la préhistoire au XXe. Mémoire d'Ardèche et Temps Présent. 2022
 Bertrand de Viviés and Claire Dalzin, Voyages romantiques en Languedoc, Catalogue de l’exposition du Musée des beaux-arts de Gaillac, château de Foucaud. Gaillac. 2002.
 Exhibition in the Paul-Dupuy Museum, in Toulouse : Les Pyrénées romantiques in 2002.

External links
 Lithographs of Eugène de Malbos on Gallica, the digital library of Bibliothèque nationale de France
 Lithographs of Eugène de Malbos on Rosalis, the Toulouse digital library
 Lithographs of Eugène de Malbos on Joconde, the digital database of French museums

References 

1811 births
1858 deaths
19th-century French painters
French male painters
French romantic painters
19th-century French lithographers
19th-century French male artists